Cape Town (also known as Mat Joubert) is a South African-German produced TV-series based on the novel Dead Before Dying by author Deon Meyer.
The series is produced by German company all-in-production, whose head Annette Reeker bought rights 5 years before starting the production. Produced without any television channel backing it, Reeker funded the series with private earnings of about 6 million Euro and wrote the episodes on her own, with English writer Mark Needham translating them from German into English. The world premiere of the series was scheduled for June 23, 2016, on Polish channel TVN.

Plot
Cop Mat Joubert is devastated following the murder of his wife, who also worked for the police. He now spends his time drinking and contemplating suicide. When he gets back to work, Mat discovers he has been partnered with a new colleague and has to investigate the murders of several men, all shot with the same German weapon. Meanwhile, elsewhere in Cape Town, young female models are being drugged, raped and murdered.

Cast and characters
Trond Espen Seim as Mat Joubert
Boris Kodjoe as Sanctus Snook
Arnold Vosloo as Robin van Rees
Marcin Dorociński as Christian Coolidge
Axel Milberg as Norbert Wernicke
Jessica Haines as Hanna Nortier
Isolda Dychauk as Irena Krol
Jody Abrahams as Bart de Wit
Ian Roberts as Gerbrand Vos
Nandi Horak as Rosina Windburg

References

External links
 

English-language television shows
Serial drama television series
South African drama television series
Television shows set in Cape Town